Horse & Country (H&C) is an equestrian sports digital media company.

Distribution

H&C was on satellite television on Sky channel 184 in the United Kingdom (UK) and is also available on Amazon Prime Video in UK & Germany and on Roku, as well as via web and mobile apps. It launched on Virgin Media Channel 298 on 21 July 2018. H&C launched to cable TV viewers in the Netherlands in June 2012. In June 2013 H&C launched in Sweden. In February 2015, H&C launched in Australia on Fetch TV. H&C launched in the US and Canada in May 2018 on Roku. H&C formed a partnership with Digital Cornucopia to enter Spain, Portugal, and Latin America in 2018.

Removal from Sky
In December 2019, H&C announced they would be closing on Sky channel 184. The move means that as of 31 January 2020, H&C will be available to view through H&C's online services, apps and other 3rd party distributors. It continued to be available on Virgin Media in Ireland and the UK but it was removed on 20 July 2020 along with Vice.

Partnering with EQ Sports Net
In January 2020, H&C announced its acquisition of the dominant US equestrian streaming provider, EQ Sports Net (EQSN). In addition to live sports programming, EQSN subscribers will now also have access to H&C TV's library. H&C TV covers the Rolex Grand Slam of Showjumping, the Longines Lumühlen Horse Trials, and the London International Horse Show from Olympia.

Programming & production

In 2012, H&C commissioned the series Getting to Greenwich, an 8-part series profiling rider contenders for London 2012 Olympics and Paralympics. H&C also commissioned Dean Dibsdall: Model Farrier, a single film about the winner of E4's Playing It Straight 2012. H&C produced in-house "Carl and Charlotte: Dressage Superstars" a 2-part series about top British Dressage riders, Carl Hester and Charlotte Dujardin.  In 2016, H&C acquired the syndicated series Walks Around Britain, featuring seasons one & two. Season three was released on the platform just one year later, back in May 2017.

2010 restructuring
In October 2010, Horse & Country TV was placed into administration by Chairman Heather Killen, who called in a £400,000 preferential loan on her own company, the day before a dismissal claim by former Managing Director Nick Ludlow was due to be heard in court. Mr. Ludlow had been fired by Ms. Killen just seven days after she finalized a successful takeover deal for the television channel, and had claimed that his 47% stake was watered down to just 16% in a share issue in November 2009. The move forced Mr. Ludlow to drop his legal action and caused investors in the channel to write off £200,000 following the collapse. Within months, Ms. Killen had relaunched the company as H&C TV. The new firm secured a global rights deal to highlights from the Badminton trials, ending a 50-year exclusive arrangement with the BBC to cover the event.

Citations

External links
H&C UK & ROI
H&C Australia
H&C Netherlands
H&C Sweden
H&C Germany

Television channels in the Netherlands
Television channels in the United Kingdom
Equestrianism
Horses in the United Kingdom
Rural society in the United Kingdom
Television channels and stations established in 2007